Helsingør Municipality (a variant English name: Elsinore Municipality; Danish: Helsingør Kommune), is a municipality  in the Capital Region on the northeast coast of the island of Zealand (Sjælland) in eastern Denmark.  The municipality covers an area of 121.6 km², and has a total population of 62,875 (1. January 2022).  Its mayor as of 1 January 2014 is Benedikte Kiær, a member of the Conservative political party.

Locations
The main town and the site of its municipal council is the town of Helsingør.

Other towns and villages include 
 Ålsgårde
 Espergærde
 Mørdrup
 Skotterup
 Snekkersten
 Stenstrup
To the east is the Øresund, the strait which separates Zealand from Sweden.  To the north is the Kattegat.

Ferry service connects the municipality at the town of Helsingør east over the Øresund to the town of Helsingborg, Sweden. The European routes E47 and E55 traverse the two cities.

Helsingør municipality was not merged with other municipalities due to the nationwide Kommunalreformen ("The Municipality Reform" of 2007).

History

The town as we know it today was founded in the 1420s by the Danish king Eric of Pomerania. He established the Sound Dues in 1429 and built the castle 'Krogen', which was made bigger in the 1580s and named Kronborg.  Kronborg Castle, known internationally as the setting of William Shakespeare's theatre play Hamlet, is today the town's main tourist attraction.

Politics

Municipal council
Helsingør's municipal council consists of 25 members, elected every four years.

Below are the municipal councils elected since the Municipal Reform of 2007.

Economy
Local companies include the Noa Noa clothing company, Barslund, Bavarian Nordic and Peter Beier Chokolade.

Twin towns – sister cities

Helsingør is twinned with:
 Harstad, Norway
 Rueil-Malmaison, France
 Sanremo, Italy
 Umeå, Sweden
 Uummannaq, Greenland
 Vaasa, Finland

See also
List of protected areas of Helsingør Municipality

References

 Municipal statistics: NetBorger Kommunefakta, delivered from KMD aka Kommunedata (Municipal Data)
 Municipal mergers and neighbors: Eniro new municipalities map

External links

Official website 
Helsingør tourist bureau

 
Municipalities in the Capital Region of Denmark
Municipalities of Denmark

fr:Helsingør